The Palazzo Corner Gheltof is Gothic-style palace located on the Grand Canal, in the Sestieri of San Marco, adjacent to the Palazzi Mocenigo, in Venice, Italy.

History
The building has undergone a number of renovations, including a major one in the 16th century.

References

Corner Gheltof
Corner Gheltof
Gothic architecture in Venice